The men's C-2 1000 metres event was an open-style, pairs canoeing event conducted as part of the Canoeing at the 1984 Summer Olympics program.

Medalists

Results

Heats
Ten teams entered in two heats on August 7. The top three finishers from each of the heats advanced directly to the final and the remaining four teams were relegated to the semifinal.

Semifinal
A semifinal was held on August 9. The top three finishers from the semifinal advanced to the final.

Final
The final was held on August 11.

References
1984 Summer Olympics official report Volume 2, Part 2. pp. 370–1. 
Sports-reference.com 1984 C-2 1000 m results.

Men's C-2 1000
Men's events at the 1984 Summer Olympics